= Rosanna Bianchi Piccoli =

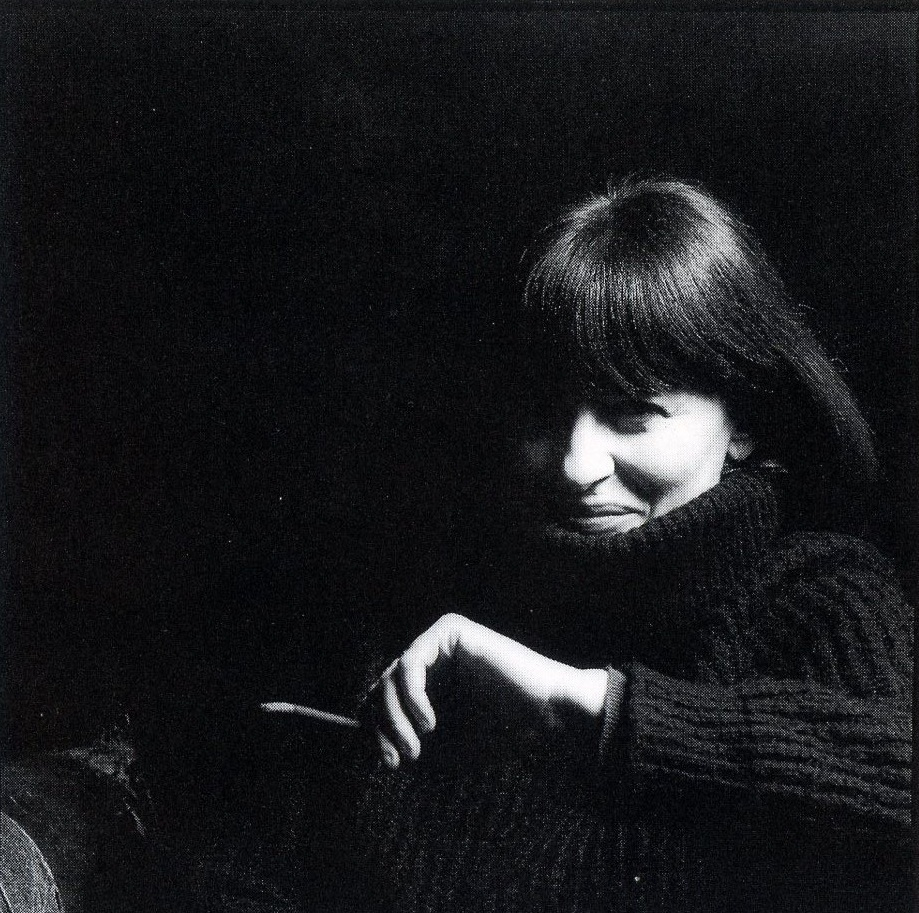
Rosanna Bianchi Piccoli in 1980

Rosanna Bianchi Piccoli (29 May 1929 – 14 February 2025) was an Italian ceramicist and artist.
